Dr. William Tyznik (April 26, 1927 – May 3, 2013) was a professor of the department of Animal Science at Ohio State University where he taught for over 40 years. Tyznik invented Frosty Paws, a frozen treat for dogs, and TizWhiz animal feed.

Education
He attended the University of Wisconsin, College of Agriculture, and received his Bachelor's (1948), Master's (1949) and Ph.D. (1951) degrees.

References

1927 births
2013 deaths
Ohio State University faculty
American biologists
University of Wisconsin–Madison College of Agricultural and Life Sciences alumni